John Cooke (born 25 April 1962) is an English former professional footballer who played as a right winger.

Career
Born in Salford, Cooke played for Sunderland, Carlisle United, Sheffield Wednesday, Carlisle United, Stockport County, Chesterfield, Gateshead, and Spennymoor United.

Cooke also made three appearances for England at the 1981 FIFA World Youth Championship.

He joined his former club Sunderland as kit manager in January 1994 and was still in post . He left the club in late 2020, with his son Jay Turner-Cooke, a Sunderland youth player, leaving the club to join rivals Newcastle United as a result.

References

1962 births
Living people
Footballers from Salford
English footballers
Association football midfielders
Sunderland A.F.C. players
Carlisle United F.C. players
Sheffield Wednesday F.C. players
Stockport County F.C. players
Chesterfield F.C. players
Gateshead F.C. players
Spennymoor United F.C. players
English Football League players
Sunderland A.F.C. non-playing staff
England youth international footballers